Andrew William Gorvin (born 10 May 1997) is an English cricketer.

Career
Gorvin attended Portsmouth Grammar School and was part of the Hampshire academy and played club cricket for Havant, even acting as stand in captain for Havant before relocating to attend Cardiff University. He played a lead role in St Fagans winning the ECB South Wales Premier League title in 2019 and 2021. He also played for Wales in the National Counties Championship and One Day Trophy, as they reached the Semi Finals in 2021. He took 3-35 for Cardiff University against Glamorgan in March 2021.

He made his List A debut on 25 July 2021, for Glamorgan in the 2021 Royal London One-Day Cup. He made his first-class debut on 5 May 2022, for Glamorgan in the 2022 County Championship.

References

External links
 

1997 births
Living people
English cricketers
Glamorgan cricketers
Cricketers from Winchester